Swathi Nakshathram Chothi (ml.സ്വാതി നക്ഷത്രം ചോതി) is an Indian Malayalam romantic drama television series, airs on Zee Keralam. The show premiered on 26 November 2018. It starred Vandana Krishnan and Sreejith Vijay in the lead roles of Swathi and Neel respectively. It is an official remake of Hindi series Badho Bahu.

Plot
The story revolves around the girl Swathi, who is criticised everyday for being fat.

Cast
Vandana Krishnan as Swathi
Sreejith Vijay / Anand Narayan as Neel Mahesh
Anjali Rao/ Archana Suseelan as Vedha 
Shobha Mohan as Vaidehi
Ravikrishnan Gopalakrishnan as Mahesh
Reena Basheer / Nila 
Noobin Johny as Giri
Sayana Krishna as Gowri
Keerthi Krishna as Nandini
Girish Nambiar as Rajeev
Daveed John as Rahul
Kaladharan as Swamiji
Sindhu Varma as Swathi's mother
Sreedevi Anil
Sumesh Surendran
Rajasenan
Nandana Chandra
Sachin SG
Santhosh Geetha
Karthika Kannan
ponnuvidhya as police officer

References

Zee Keralam original programming
Malayalam-language television shows